This is the list of television channels in Estonia.

Public 
 ETV – news, current affairs, culture, sports and general entertainment.
 ETV2 – general entertainment, sports, news and children's programming.
 ETV+ – Russian language programming.

Commercial 
Kanal 2 – news, current affairs and general entertainment.
Duo 3 – general entertainment channel. Replacing Sony Channel Estonia since April 1, 2021.
Duo 4 (former Kanal 11) – general entertainment. Mostly for women.
Duo 5 (former Kanal 12) – general entertainment. Mostly for men.
Duo 6 – general entertainment channel. Replacing Sony Turbo Estonia since April 1, 2021.
Kanal 7 – russian-language general entertainment channel.
Kanal 7+ – russian-language general entertainment channel. Mostly for women.
Kino 7 – russian-language movies channel.
Semejka – russian-language children channel.
MyHits – music channel.
Eesti Kanal – retro channel.
SmartZone – young entertainment channel.
KidZone – children channel. Mostly for older children aged 6-12 years.
KidZone Mini – children channel. Mostly for children aged 6-12 years.
FilmZone – movies channel.
FilmZone+ – movies channel.
TV3 – news, current affairs and general entertainment channel.
TV6 – general entertainment channel. Mostly for men.
TV3 Life – general entertainment target to the womens.
TV3 Plus – general entertainment in the Russian language (Since 1 April 2022, as FTA).
TV3 Film – movies channel.
TV3 Sport – sports channel.
Fox Life – general entertainment channel.
FOX – general entertainment channel.
Etnotv Eesti – is a 24 hours broadcasting TV channel devoted to promotion of authentic historical traditions, spiritual and material cultural heritage of the nation.

Regional 
Alo TV – music and news channel, Tartu-based.

Former channels

Estonian Christian Television
EVTV – a predecessor of TV3. Shared channel code with RTV. Aired from August 1, 1993 to December 31, 1995.
Tipp TV – a predecessor of TV1. Aired from September 1, 1995 to March 23, 1996.
EVTV/RTV - A temporary channel formed by EVTV and RTV before becoming TV3. Aired from January 1, 1996 to March 10, 1996.
TV 1 – Commercial channel. News, current affairs, sports and general entertainment. Aired from February 10, 1997 to October 2001.
Neljas – music, news and general entertainment channel.
Kalev Sport – sports channel, a predecessor of TV4.
TV4 (Kalev Sport) – sports channel, a predecessor of TV14.
Seitse – Aired until December 31, 2016 when it was replaced with MyHits.
MTV Eesti – music and entertainment channel.
PBK (Estonia)
Ren-TV Estonia
RTV/ETV - predecessor of RTV. Showed its programming on ETV as programming block. Aired from September 21, 1992 to July 30, 1993.
RTV – a predecessor of TV3. Shared channel code with EVTV. Aired from July 31, 1993 to December 31, 1995.
TV14 – general entertainment channel. Codeshare with Tallinna TV.
Nickelodeon Estonia
Tallinna TV – owned by Tallinn city government. Aired from January 1, 2011 to September 30, 2019.
Sony Channel - Aired until March 31, 2021 when it was replaced with Duo3
Sony Turbo - Aired until March 31, 2021 when it was replaced with Duo6
Nõmme TV

References

Estonia
Tele